Fish Lake is a natural lake in South Dakota, in the United States.

Fish Lake is a habitat of freshwater fish, hence the name.

See also
List of lakes in South Dakota

References

Lakes of South Dakota
Lakes of Deuel County, South Dakota